The Most Exalted Order of the Sultan Ibrahim Johor (Malay: Darjah Sultan Ibrahim Johor Yang Amat Disanjungi) is a knighthood order of the Sultanate of Johor.

History 
The Order was founded by Sultan Ibrahim Sultan Iskandar in conjunction with his coronation on 23 March 2015.

Classes 
The Order is awarded in three classes:
The Honourable Grand Knight (Dato' Sri Mulia, post-nominal letters : SMIJ)
The Honourable Knight (Dato' Mulia, post-nominal letters : DMIJ)
The Honourable Companion (Setia Mulia, post-nominal letters : SIJ)

Recipients

The Honourable Grand Knight (S.M.I.J.) 
 Tunku Ismail Idris (2015)
 Tunku Aminah Maimunah Iskandariah (2015)
 Tunku Idris Iskandar (2015)
 Tunku Abdul Jalil Iskandar (2015)
 Tunku Abdul Rahman Hassanal Jeffri (2015)
 Tunku Abu Bakar (2015)
 Enche’ Besar Hajah Khalsom Abdullah (2015)
 Mohamed Khaled Nordin (2015)
 Abdul Rahim Ramli (2015)
Raja Zarith Sofiah (2017)
Daing Malik Daing Rahaman (2017)

Foreign Recipients

The Honourable Grand Knight (S.M.I.J.) 
 Rodrigo Duterte (2019)
 Apirat Kongsompong (2020)
Sultan Hassanal Bolkiah (2020)
 Ho Ching (2022)

See also 
 Orders, decorations, and medals of the Malaysian states and federal territories#Johor
 Order of precedence in Johor
 List of post-nominal letters (Johor)

References

External links 
Colecciones Militares (Antonio Prieto Barrio), 

Orders of chivalry of Malaysia
Orders, decorations, and medals of Johor